Chryseobacterium oncorhynchi  is a Gram-negative and rod-shaped bacteria from the genus of Chryseobacterium which has been isolated from the trout Oncorhynchus mykiss.

References

Further reading

External links
Type strain of Chryseobacterium oncorhynchi at BacDive -  the Bacterial Diversity Metadatabase

oncorhynchi
Bacteria described in 2012